Players in bold have later been capped at full international level.

Group A

Head coach: Ivo Šušak

Head coach: Karel Brückner

Head coach: Han Berger

Head coach: Iñaki Sáez

Group B

Head coach: Howard Wilkinson

Head coach: Marco Tardelli

Head coach: Dušan Radolský

Head coach: Raşit Çetiner

References

Squads
UEFA European Under-21 Championship squads